Jodi Number One is an Indian Tamil-language dance competition reality television show broadcast on Star Vijay and from the year 2006. Its contestants are couples who are generally television stars in their own right, often from the television industry. Over twelve years, Jodi Number One has rolled out ten seasons.

Series

Season 1 
The first season aired on every Friday to Saturday at 20:00 from October 2006. The show witnessed four real life couples and 4 fictional (real) life couples engage in a 13-weeks dancing competition. The panel of judges composed of dance master Kala, actor Prashanth and  Ramya Krishnan chose the two finalists. The viewers themselves chose the third finalist. Divyadarshini and Aravind Akash serving as the hosts.

Prem Kumar and Pooja - The winners of the Wild Card round were judged the champions of Jodi No. 1 by the audiences. They received 10 lakhs as the prize money.

Hosts
 Divyadarshini - TV actress
 Aravind Akash - Film actor

Judges
 Prashanth - Film actor
 Ramya Krishnan - Film actress
 Kala - Choreographer

Couples

 The highlighted green rows are the Real Couples.
 The highlighted pink rows are the Reel Couples.

Guests
 Dhanush - Film actor
 Priyamani  - Film actress
 Lakshmi Rai - Film actress
 Rahasya - Film actress
 Yogi B - Rapper
 Dr Burn - Rapper

Season 2 
Jodi no.1 season 2 witnessed many small screen couples, with 8 new celebrity couples. The 8 couples were Kalaiselvan Tinku, Preethi, Yugendren, Hayma Malini, Sree, Krithika, Prithviraj, Uma Riyaz, Arvind, Lakshmi, Irfan, Monisha, Venkat, Nisha, Dev and Aishwarya. Silambarasan, Sangeetha and Raju Sundaram were the judges. Divyadharshini and Deepak Dinkar hosted the season. Tinku and Preethi were the winners of Jodi no. 1 season 2, receiving the 10 lakh prize, whereas Venkat and Nisha won the Best Performance award taking home the Chevy Spark.

Hosts
 Divyadharshini - TV actress
 Deepak Dinkar - TV actor

Judges
 Silambarasan - Film actor
 Sangeetha - Film actress
 Raju Sundaram - Choreographer

Couples

 The highlighted pink rows are the Reel Couples.
 The highlighted green rows are the Real Couples.

Guests
 Prabhu Deva - Film actor
 Ramya Krishnan - Film actress and Season 1 Judge
 Sneha  - Film actress
 Suchitra  - Playback singer
 Ragasya  - Film actress
 Abbas - Film actor
 Priyamani  - Film actress
 Shaam - Film actor
 Madhumitha  - Film actress
 Jeeva - Film actor

Season 3
S. J. Suryah, Sangeetha and Raju Sundaram were the judges. Divyadharshini and Deepak Dinkar has once again been appointed as the host for the second time. Kiran and Priya as the winners.

Hosts
 Divyadarshini - TV actress
 Deepak - TV actor

Judges
 S. J. Suryah - Film actor
 Sangeetha - Film actress
 Raju Sundaram - Choreographer

Couples

 The highlighted pink rows are the Reel Couples.
 The highlighted green rows are the Real Couples.

Guests
 Simran - Actress
 Jeeva - Actor
 Nila - Actress
 Lakshmi Rai - Actress

Season 4
Jeeva, Sangeetha and Aishwarya Rajinikanth were the judges. Divyadharshini and Deepak Dinkar has once again been appointed as the host for the third time. Michael Thangadurai and Hemalata as the winners.

Hosts
 Divyadarshini - TV actress
 Deepak - TV actor

Judges
 Jeeva - Film actor
 Aishwarya Rajinikanth - Film director
 Sangeetha - Film actress

Couples

Guests
 Kamna Jethmalani - Film Actress
 Surya Sivakumar - Film Actor
 Sameera Reddy - Film Actress
 Divya Spandana - Film Actress
 Shanthnoo Bhagyaraj - Film Actor
 Srikanth - Film Actor
 Jai - Film Actor
 A. R. Murugadoss - Film Director

Season 5
The fifth season aired from October 2011. Prem Gopal and Premini as the winners.

Hosts
 Deepak - TV anchor, actor

Judges
 Raadhika - Film actress
 Gautami - Film actress
 Shobana - Film actress and a Choreographer
 Sangeetha - Film actress

Couples

Guests
 Sangeetha - Film actress
 Shaam - Film actor
 Raghava Lawrence - Film actor
 Sandhya - Film actress
 Karthik Sivakumar - Film actor
 Tamannaah Bhatia - Film actress
 Arya - Film actor
 Pooja - Film actress

Season 5

Directed By 
 Daniel Aloysius Xavier

Produced by 
 DStudio

Hosts
 Sivakarthikeyan - TV Host and Actor
 Bhavana Balakrishnan - TV Host
 Deepak Dinkar - TV Host

Judges
 Ramya Krishnan - Film actress (Main Judge)
 Shanthnoo Bhagyaraj -Film Actor (Intro & Mix Your Strength Round Judge)
 Prasanna (actor) -Film Actor (Group Formation Round Judge)
 Sneha  - Film actress (Dasavathram, Navarasam, Classics & Animals Round Judge)
 Meena - Film actress (Rajini Special Round Judge)
 Shaam - Film Actor(Fusion round)
 Sangeetha - Film actress (Tamil Nadu Round, Devotional Round and Romance Round)
 Bhanu Priya - Film actress (Remix Round)
 Khushbu - Film actress (Social Issues and Filmy Round)
 Kalyan (choreographer) (Semifinal, first wild card round and second wild card round)
 Bharath - Actor (first final and grand final)

Rounds
 1st Round - Mix Your Strength
 2nd Round - Group Formation
 3rd Round - Dasavathram Round
 4th Round - Rajini Special
 5th Round - Fusion
 6th Round - Navarasam
 7th Round - Tamil Nadu
 8th Round - Devotional
 9th Round - Romance
 10th Round - Classics
 11th Round - Animals
 12th Round - Remix
 13th Round - Social Issues
 14th Round - Filmy Round

Couples

Eliminated Jodi's

Season 6
The seven season aired from October 2018. This Jodi season 6 was different from the previous seasons. Each couples paired with choreographer and an actor. SOL Productions produced the seven as well.

Directed By 
 Daniel Aloysius Xavier

Creative Team 
 Sithara
 Rahul Vijay
 Manivannan 
 Rajesh Narayanan

Hosts
 Divyadarshini - TV actress

Judges
 Ramya Krishnan - Film actress
 B. Saroja Devi - Veteran actress - episode 2 (Classical round)
 Radha - Film actress
 Ambika - Film actress
 Poornima Jayaram - Film actress - episode 4 (90s round)
 Bharath - Film actor - episode 5 (2000 round)
 Kalyan (choreographer)

Winners
 First Place: Rafiq Raxx and Gabriella
 Second Place: Mani and Devi Priya
 Third Place: Robo Shankar and Sandhya
 Fourth Place: Sathya and Shilpa

Couples

Season 7
This Jodi season 7 was different from the previous seasons. All couples are actors with a few exceptions. Also for the first time, elimination is as individuals rather as a pair. One male and female contestants each with the lowest cumulative scores are eliminated each week. The first contestants to be eliminated this way are Vetri and Shalini.

Creative Team 
 Sithara
 Rahul Vijay
 Manivannan 
 Sugenthiren

Hosts
 Divyadarshini - TV actor

Judges
 Radha - Film actress
 Raadhika - Film actress - episode 4 (Folk Round)
 Kalyan (Choreographer)
 Sreedhar - Choreographer (Old Songs Round)
 Gayathri Raguram - Choreographer (Old Songs Round)

Winners
 First Place: Amudhavanan and Anandhi
 Second Place: Lokesh and Sunita Gogoi
 Third Place: Siddarth and Priya 
 Fourth Place: Yuvraj and Jennifer

Couples

Season 8
The eight season aired from 25 October 2014 to 12 September 2015 and ended with 46 Episodes. Radha and Kalyan were the judges. Priyanka Deshpande and Erode Mahesh hosted the season. Rahman and Sofia as the winners.

Hosts
 Priyanka Deshpande
 Erode Mahesh

Judges
 Radha(actress)
 Kalyan

Couples

Season 9
It started on 12 November 2016 and ended on 16 April 2017 with 44 Episodes. T. Rajendar, Sadha and Devayani were the Main judges. Priyanka Deshpande and KPY Kuraishi hosted the season. The show Directed by Daniel Aloysius Xavier. DStudio produced the nine season as well. Mani and Felina as the winners.

Creative Team 
 Sithara
 Rahul Vijay
 Manivannan 
 Prabhu
 Sugenthiren
 Vimal
 Dipshi Blessy
 Grace Veronica

Host
 Priyanka Deshpande - TV Anchor
 KPY Kuraishi

Judges
 T. Rajendar
 Sadha
 Devayani
 Radha (Special Judge)
 Namitha (Special judge)

Rounds
 Old Memories Round 
 Tentkotta Round
 Celebration Round
 Thannila Gandam Round (only for Real Jodis)
 Ponggal Special
 Fusion Round
 Kid's Special Round
 Masala Mix (Reel) / Folk (Real)
 Solli Adi Round
 Horror Round
 80s Club Mix Round
 Mass Hero Round
 Group Formation Round
 Semifinal Round

Winners
 First Place: Mani and Felina 
 Second Place: Adi and Sonali
 Third Place: Sunita and Priya
 Fourth Place: Alena and Shajid

Couples

Season 10
The ten season aired from 4 November 2018 to 13 January and ended with 20 Episodes. Bhavana and Rio Raj hosted the season. The show Directed by Daniel Aloysius Xavier. DStudio produced the ten season as well. Lokesh and Megna as the winners.

Host
 Rio Raj (former contestant) 
 Bhavana

Judges
 Audiences (For the first time audiences will cast their votes and judge every performance.)

Team Captains
 Yashika Aannand
 Mahat Raghavendra
 Divyadharshini
 Ma Ka Pa Anand

Creative team
 Rahul Vijay
 Sugenthiran
 Lakshman Kumar
 Sridharan
 Martin
 Jerome
 Durgadhasan
 Sandra
 Mukund
 Arun

Rounds
 Introduction Round (non-competitive)
 Jodi-Patti Thiruvizha Round (non-competitive)
 Blockbusters Round 
 Old Songs Round 
 Romance Round
 Festival/Celebration Round
 Re-creation Round
 Horror Round
 Ticket to Finale (rankings based on average score by audiences and team captains)
 Grand Semi Finale (rankings based on average score by audiences and team captains)

Couples
All Ranking and Marking will be added here

 = Danger Zone 

: Since Week 3 had no elimination, the marks will be added with Week 4 and the team with the lowest marks will be eliminated.

: Since Week 5 had no elimination, the marks will be added with Week 6 and the team with the lowest marks will be eliminated.

: There will be no elimination on Week 7. But there will be two tickets directly to finale ( and ) based on marks given by Judges and Leaders.

: Guest performance by Kumaran and Divyadharshini for Rowdy Baby song.

Guests
 Vijay Antony - Grand Opening
 Aishwarya Dutta - Re-creation Round
 Aishwarya Dutta - Grand Finale

Grand Finale
 Winner - Lokesh & Megna
 1st runner-up - Kumaran & Chitra
 2nd runner-up - Vishal & Sreethu and Ramar & Rhema (points tied)
3rd runner-up - Atheesh & Uthra
4th runner-up - Britton & Anila
5th runner-up - Azeem & Shivani

: Star Vijay also celebrated "20 years of Dhivyadharshini" illustrating her career as an anchor in Vijay Television for the past 20 years during the Jodi Fun Unlimited Grand Finale. Dhivyadharshini was presented with a family portrait depicting her late father whom she lost at a young age in addition to a memorabilia award with illustration of all the shows that she hosted.

References

External links 
 

Star Vijay original programming
2006 Tamil-language television series debuts
Tamil-language dance television shows
Tamil-language reality television series
Tamil-language television shows
Television shows set in Tamil Nadu
2011 Tamil-language television seasons
2019 Tamil-language television series endings